The molecular formula C23H34O4 may refer to:

 Androstenediol diacetate
 Calcitroic acid
 Digitoxigenin
 Prebediolone acetate
 Rostafuroxin
 Testosterone diacetate

Molecular formulas